The Cullen Medal, named for William Cullen, is awarded by the Royal College of Physicians of Edinburgh for “the greatest benefit done to Practical Medicine”.

References

Awards established in 1890
Medicine awards